Preah Thong Neang Neak statue symbolises the birth of Khmer land, culture, traditions and civilisation of Cambodia. The statue is 21 metres tall on a pedestal 6.34 metres high (27.34 metres in total) is the largest copper statue in Cambodia and It weighs in total 60 tonnes and faces the sea.

History
Preah Thong (Kaundinya I / Y Da) and Neang Neak (Queen Soma / Y Ga) are symbolic personas in Khmer culture. They are thought to have founded the pre-Angkorian state of Funan. Much of Khmer wedding customs can be traced back to the marriage of Preah Thong and Neang Neak.

According to reports by two Chinese envoys, Kang Tai and Zhu Ying, the state of Funan was established by an Indian named Kaundinya. In the first century CE, Kaundinya was given instruction in a dream to take a magic bow from a temple and defeat a Naga princess named Soma (Chinese: Liuye, “Willow Leaf”), the daughter of the king of the Naga. She later married Kaundinya and their lineage became the royal dynasty of Funan. Kaundinya later built a capital, Vyadhapura and the kingdom also came to be known as Kambojadeśa.

See also
Statue of King Father Norodom Sihanouk

References

See also
Funan

Cambodian literature
Southeast Asian literature